Porter is a large-scale impact crater in the Thaumasia quadrangle on the planet Mars, situated in Aonia Terra at 50.8° south and 113.9º west. The name was chosen in 1973 by the International Astronomical Union in honour of the US astronomer and explorer, Russell W. Porter (1871-1949).

Impact craters generally have a rim with ejecta around them, in contrast volcanic craters usually do not have a rim or ejecta deposits.  As craters get larger (greater than 10 km in diameter) they usually have a central peak. The peak is caused by a rebound of the crater floor following the impact.

See also 
 Climate of Mars
 Geology of Mars
 HiRISE
 List of craters on Mars
 Martian gullies
 Ore resources on Mars
 Planetary nomenclature
 Water on Mars

References

Sources
Porter on Google Mars.
USGS Gazetteer of Planetary Nomenclature.

Impact craters on Mars
Thaumasia quadrangle